Roman Čermák (born 11 September 1959) is a Czech former cyclist. He competed in the individual pursuit event at the 1988 Summer Olympics.

References

External links
 

1959 births
Living people
Czech male cyclists
Olympic cyclists of Czechoslovakia
Cyclists at the 1988 Summer Olympics
Sportspeople from Prague